Abū ‘Abd Allāh Muḥammad ibn Sa‘d ibn Manī‘ al-Baṣrī al-Hāshimī or simply Ibn Sa'd and nicknamed Scribe of Waqidi (Katib al-Waqidi), was a scholar and Arabian biographer. Ibn Sa'd was born in 784/785 CE (168 AH) and died on 16 February 845 CE (230 AH). Ibn Sa'd was from Basra, but lived mostly in Baghdad, hence the nisba al-Basri and al-Baghdadi respectively. He is said to have died at the age of 62 in Baghdad and was buried in the cemetery of the Syrian gate.

Kitāb aṭ-Tabaqāt al-Kabīr
The Kitāb aṭ-Tabaqāt al-Kabīr is a compendium of biographical information about famous Islamic personalities. This eight-volume work contains the lives of Muhammad, his Companions and Helpers, including those who fought at the Battle of Badr as a special class, and of the following generation, the Followers, who received their traditions from the Companions. Ibn Sa'd's authorship of this work is attested in a postscript to the book added by a later writer. In this notice he is described as a "client of al-Husayn ibn ‘Abdullah of the ‘Abbasid family". The work was subject to a major study by a European scholar already in 1869.

Contents
 Books 1 and 2 contain a biography (sirah) of Muhammad.
 Books 3 and 4 contain biographies of companions of Muhammad.
 Books 5, 6 and 7 contain biographies of later Islamic scholars.
 Book 8 contains biographies of Islamic women.

Published editions

Arabic
  (includes brief German synopses with page references for each book) [reprinted in 2022 as Biography of Muḥammad, His Companions and the Successors up to the Year 230 of the Hijra: Eduard Sachau's Edition of ‘Kitāb al-Ṭabaqāt al-Kabīr’ ]
 In 1968, Iḥsān Abbās edited it (Beirut: Dār Sādir).
 Contains 11 volumes.

English
 S. Moinul Haq (transl.), Ibn Sa'd's Kitab al-Tabaqat al-Kabir: Volume I, Parts I & II (Karachi: Pakistan Historical Society, 1967 [= Pakistan Historical Society Publication, no. 46]) online link.
 S. Moinul Haq (transl.), Ibn Sa'd's Kitab al-Tabaqat al-Kabir: Volume II, Parts I & II (Karachi: Pakistan Historical Society, 1972 [= Pakistan Historical Society Publication, no. 59]) online link.
 Abridged translations of Volumes 3, 5, 6, 7 and 8 have been translated by Aisha Bewley and published under the titles of The Companions of Badr, The Men of Madina-II, The Scholars of Kufa, The Men of Madina-I, and The Women of Madina.

See also
List of Islamic scholars

References

Attribution

External links

 Biodata at MuslimScholars.info

784 births
845 deaths
9th-century historians from the Abbasid Caliphate
Hadith scholars
9th-century Arabs
Biographical evaluation scholars